The City Schools of Decatur is a public charter school district in DeKalb County, Georgia, United States. It serves and is based in Decatur.

City Schools of Decatur has an enrollment of approximately 5,700 students and operates 10 schools: one preschool, five K–2 lower elementary schools, two 3–5 upper elementary schools, one middle school, and one high school.

Students perform above the state and national averages on standardized tests at all grade levels. Each year City Schools of Decatur has ranked in the top ten districts in Georgia for SAT performance. Decatur High School has been named an AP Challenge and AP Merit school in Georgia.

From 1902 until 1932, Decatur schools held classes on Saturday, a policy speculated to have been created to keep Jewish students from attending.

Schools 

 Preschool
College Heights Early Childhood Learning Center

 Elementary schools
Clairemont Elementary School (K–2)
Glennwood Elementary School (K–2)
Oakhurst Elementary School (K–2)
Westchester Elementary School (K–2)
Winnona Park Elementary School (K–2)
Fifth Avenue Upper Elementary School (3–5)
Talley Street Upper Elementary School (3–5)

 Middle school
Beacon Hill Middle School (6–8)

 High school
Decatur High School (9–12)

References

External links 

City School of Decatur

School districts in Georgia (U.S. state)
Education in DeKalb County, Georgia
Decatur, Georgia